A Man Reading (Saint Ivo?) is the name given to a panel painting in the collection of the National Gallery, United Kingdom. The work has been attributed to Rogier van der Weyden, and as to depict Ivo of Kermartin. The National Gallery's website attributes it to the "workshop of Rogier van der Weyden". It has been claimed that the work is not by van der Weyden or other artists working under his name in Early Netherlandish painting, but is instead a forgery by Eric Hebborn. According to an article published in The Independent by Geraldine Norman, in 1996 Hebborn claimed to have painted the National Gallery's Saint Ivo.

References

1450s paintings
Collections of the National Gallery, London
Paintings by Rogier van der Weyden